Abdel Karim Boutadjine (born 23 March 1989) is a French football player of Algerian descent who plays as a forward. He is under contract with AS Saint-Ouen-l'Aumône.

Career
Boutadjine played for several lower league French teams as Laval, Bayonne, UJA Alfortville, Noisy-le-Sec, Évian TG II before joining the Romanian first league Pandurii Târgu Jiu. He played one season for Pandurii, being mostly used as a substitute.

In June 2013 Boutadjine was close to be transferred by Dinamo București but was not kept in the team after being tested in trial games, due to weak performances. In January 2014 he joined the Liga I team, Universitatea Cluj.

Honours

Club
Pandurii
Liga I: runner-up 2013

References

External links
 Profile on Universitatea Cluj official site
 
 

1989 births
Living people
Sportspeople from Argenteuil
French footballers
Association football forwards
Stade Lavallois players
Aviron Bayonnais FC players
UJA Maccabi Paris Métropole players
Olympique Noisy-le-Sec players
Thonon Evian Grand Genève F.C. players
CS Pandurii Târgu Jiu players
FC Universitatea Cluj players
French sportspeople of Algerian descent
Championnat National players
Liga I players
French expatriate footballers
Expatriate footballers in Romania
French expatriate sportspeople in Romania
Footballers from Val-d'Oise